Circassian music refers to the traditional songs and instruments of the Circassians.

Instruments 
Circassian music is characterized by certain instruments, including:

 Pshine, an accordion which is played in a specific way to produce Circassian tunes.
 Pkhachich, 2 sets of "wood blocks", each set containing about six pieces of wood held by hand; when a player strikes them together they produce a pure sound of wood to indicate the beat rhythm of the song.
 Bereban, a drum known as 'Dhol'; in Adyghe it is called "Shontrip". Struck by hand or two short batons. Drummers' hands bleed when they train, or overplay.
 Pkhetaw, ('Wood-strike') made from wood looks like a small table and it is used for hitting it with sticks for tempo.
 Apa-pshine, a three string lute.
 Qamil, the Circassian flute.
 Shik'epshine (Adyghe: ШыкIэпшынэ), a Circassian stringed instrument. (Horse-tail violin.)

Dances 
While there is a culture of song-storytelling by travelling 'Woredi'o's or  'Song-tellers', Circassian music used most often today is closely tied to Circassian dance. There are several dances that are performed differently:

Qaashuo is a piece with (4:4) time signature, and usually this piece demonstrates the relationship between the Sh'ale (boy) and the Pshashe (girl), this relationship which is built out of love, cooperation and strength. Usually 'Qafe' is the main social dance in a 'Djegu' (a Circassian dance gathering, literally meaning 'play') and there are more than 100 qafes written by different Circassian artists, apart from the original traditional dances, and the individualised styles by each self-trained of the Circassian society.

Wygg is a formal piece with (8:4) time signature, and usually this piece is played before Challas are going to war, but nowadays it is played at the end of the Djegu involving all couples present, and usually it follows this rhythm each eight time intervals a new musical phrase is introduced, and this piece may be repeated several times since more than ten different Wuigs are available. It is said it was also used as a form of worship by circling a great tree that symbolises the forest God, Mez-i-t'ha. This 'rondel' type variant is the ancestor of the populasied dance known as The Circassian Circle danced by the Circassians' distant Celtic cousins after a cultural influx in the 18th century.

Tlleperush is a dance which originates from the Black Sea coastal area.  It is a piece with (4:4) time signature, and the word "Tleperush" means "leg kick" and usually this piece is faster than Kafa and Widj, almost equal in tempo to known "Lezginka" but different in style and follows this rhythm (1&2..3&4) and this rhythm is produced by Pshina and Pxachach and Pkhetaw (a wood hitting instrument for tempo). Abkhazians have this dance too, and they call it "Apsua Koshara"

Zefauk' means "approach to each other".  It is a piece with (4:4) time signature, and very similar to Kafa; the word "Zefauk" means (forward and backward) and it defines how it is danced by going 4 steps forward and another four backward exactly as the Kafa but with different musical taste.

Sheshen means "horse behaving".  The dance is a fast piece with (4:4) time signature; this particular piece is played differently by pulling the Bellows of the Pshina in and out rapidly to create an Off Beat Rhythm which produces a Rhythm two times faster than its time signature, and the word shishan is a Circassian word and it is not linked to Chechen.

Tllepech'as is a fast dance and it is an improvisation dance it is considered to be one of the ancient dance of the Circassians, "Tlepechas" means "stick toes in the ground" the dance is based on the Nart sagas legends that used to dance on their toes.

Zighelet means "be the top".  The dance is very energetic and fast, and it considered to be the fastest dance in the Caucasus. It is danced in pairs, in which the male dances fast and strong to show his skills, and the woman dances gentle but moves fast.

Hakull'ash' means "lame man move".  At the beginning it was a joke and comedy dance to make the viewers laugh, but with time it became part of the Circassian repertoire; its leg moves look like lame moves but the dance is a fast dance.

Lezginka is the Russian name given to the signature dance of Lezghi people of Daghestan.  Daghestan dances, being of the mountains, are fast-paced, with sharp, angular movements both for women and men. The Adyghes have only adopted the men's dance into their version, with the women doing almost nothing but provide a side attraction or stage audience by clapping or twirling while men perform more complex moves as display. The dance-step involves a raised bent-knee inward kick followed by a very quick shuffle for the men, whereas the women walk straight on tiptoe among Adyghes, and follow men's active step among Daghestanis.

It is a favourite social dance, frequently used at weddings and gatherings of all Adyghe communities, or communities of the North Caucasus (Circassians), where the men and women stand in two half-moon circles in a ring, one leader for each, called the Hatiyaak'o, arranging which couple dances next according to requests from either gender. It is rude to refuse on either side. 
The men go out one by one in this order, circle once before standing in front of the lady of their choice, pre-notified by the ladies' Hatiyaak'o, the lady greets the gentleman by rising on her toes, opening her arms in a slight angle to the sides, delicately posing her fingertips, looking modestly down, and bowing only her head. He returns the greeting by bowing his head as he raises one arm and folds it at a right angle in front of his chest. 
She starts, he follows, both on tiptoe, sometimes on toe knuckles, to show off his skill. 
A man must always keep a woman in front of him, to his left. The idea is to 'protect' her on his non-combat arm's side, while his 'fighting' arm is outside, ready to 'strike' an outsider.
They complete one circle before going to the centre, where he performs tricks and movements of his choice to impress her. She may or may not return his efforts by twirling in place or clapping for him, in time to the music. Eye contact must be maintained. It is very rude for a man to turn his back to the lady, or take his eyes off her, even if she is in front of him, a custom now obsolete among the Adyghes living with the peoples of the fundamentally male-dominant Middle East, where gender is segregated as a base culture. Younger men have been seen to turn their backs to show off to the enthusiastically clapping other men.

In Daghestan, young men may use Lezginka as a men-only skill-contest type of dance, with a lot of energy, enthusiasm and soul fire :)
Women, too, but more rarely, and as a pleasant surprise show of skill.

Qame-ch'as is the 'short-dagger' (Qame) dance.  The dancer shows his skill with the "Qama", the Circassian dagger, it is a fast dance and it is a competition dance between men, and sometimes it is danced as solo.
The Qame is also used in persian martial arts. Ancient cousin of the gladius, it could have found its way to the armies of Xerxes via Alexander.

Osh'ha c'hes or Bghi'ris is the mountaineers' (Mountain-Dwellers') dance.  It is a very fast dance, danced by men showing their skills. The moves are hard and strong, showing the character of the mountaineers.

Apsni Apsua is the famous Abkhaz dance.  Abkhazians are considered the origin of the Circassians; their nearest descendants are the Abzax, or Abaze-yex (literally Abhaza-descending). They are very close in blood, language, culture, traditions with the Adyghe, in time Adyghe adopted their brothers' and neighbours' dance.

Circassian artists 
The Adyghe Anthem was originally composed by Iskhak Shumafovich Mashbash and Umar Khatsitsovich Tkhabisimov, but after the diaspora almost all Circassians immigrated to different countries such as Jordan, Syria, Turkey and many more.

Notable artists from Turkey include:
Şhaguj Mehmet Can, Instrumentalist
Thazpel Mustafa, Instrumentalist
Oğuz Altay, Instrumentalist
Semih Canbolat, Instrumentalist

Syria include:
Tambi Djemouk, Instrumentalist

Germany include:
Murat Kansat, Instrumentalist

Jordan:
Firas Valntine, Musician
Ivan Bakij, Musician
Hasan Qayet, Musician , Producer , Sound Engineer.
Orhan Bersiqu, Instrumentalist
Rakan Qojas, Instrumentalist
Blan Jalouqa, Instrumentalist
Muhannad Nasip, Instrumentalist
Yazan Stash, Instrumentalist 
ahmad aiy, musician
Timur Shawash, Musician

Composers
Composers of Circassian music differ in style but all are governed by the same theory of Folkloric Circassian music.

Back in the Kavkas, there are many Pshinawas (player) who produce Circassian music such as:
Hapcha Zaodin – Lead Accordionist for Kabardinka.
Hasan Sokov – Lead Accordionist for Kabardinka.
Aslan Leiv – Well known as Aslan Dudar.
Aslan Tlebzu – Solo Accordionist.

In other countries, there are composers not just of Circassian music but also for different musical genres, including:
Saeed Bazouqa – Solo Producer/Composer.
Ahmad Aiy – Solo Producer/Composer and Lead Accordionist for Elbrus.

See also
 Music of Adygea

Notes

References 

Bereghwn (Baragunov), V. H. and He’wpe, Zh., Narodnaya instrumentalnaya muzika adigov (cherkesov) [National Instrumental Music of the Circassians], Nalchik: El'-Fa, 2005. [600 pieces]
Bereghwn (Baragunov), V. H. and Qardenghwsch' (Kardangushev), Z. P'. (compilers), Adige Weredxemre Pshinalhexemre, Yape Txilh.
Narodnie pesni i instrumentalnie naigrishi adigov, tom 1 [Circassian Songs and Instrumental Folk-Tunes, Vol. 1], Moscow: All-Union Book Publishing House 'Soviet Composer', 1980. Online. Available HTTP: <http://www.circassianlibrary.org/library.php?lang=en&mn=4&sbmn=1> (accessed 11 November 2007). [Edited by E. V. Gippius. This, and the other volumes in the series, are seminal works on Circassian musical lore. Some of the collected songs and chants are very ancient indeed]
Adige Weredxemre Pshinalhexemre, Yet’wane Txilh. Narodnie pesni i instrumentalnie naigrishi adigov, tom 2 [Circassian Songs and Instrumental Folk-Tunes, Vol. 2], Moscow: All-Union Book Publishing House 'Soviet Composer', 1981.
Adige Weredxemre Pshinalhexemre, Yeschane Txilh. Narodnie pesni i instrumentalnie naigrishi adigov, tom 3 [Circassian Songs and Instrumental Folk-Tunes, Vol. 3, Parts 1 and 2], Moscow: All-Union Book Publishing House 'Soviet Composer', 1986, 1990.
Beshkok, M., Adigeiski folklorni tanets [Adigean Folkloric Dances], Maikop, 1990.
Beshkok, M. I. and Nagaitseva, L. G., Adigeiski narodni tanets [Adigean Folk Dances], Maikop: Adigean Branch of the Krasnodar Book Press, 1982.
Jaimoukha, Amjad, The Circassians: A Handbook, London: RoutledgeCurzon (Taylor & Francis); New York: Palgrave and Routledge, 2001.
Jaimoukha, Amjad, Circassian Culture and Folklore: Hospitality Traditions, Cuisine, Festivals & Music (Kabardian, Cherkess, Adigean, Shapsugh & Diaspora), Bennett and Bloom, 2010.
Jaimoukha, Amjad, 'The Circassian Minstrels'. Online. Available HTTP: <https://web.archive.org/web/20110716084136/http://www.reocities.com/jaimoukha/Circassian_Minstrels.html> (accessed 20 July 2008).
Sokolova, A. N., 'Zhanrovaya klassifikatsiya adigskikh narodnikh pesen [Genre-Classification of Circassian National Songs]', in Kultura i bit adigov [The Culture and Way of Life of the Circassians], The Adigean Science and Research Institute, Maikop, issue 6, 1986.
Zhanrovaya klassifikatsiya adigskikh narodnikh pesen [Genre-Classification of Circassian National Songs]', in Kultura i bit adigov [The Culture and Way of Life of the Circassians], The Adigean Science and Research Institute, Maikop, issue 7, 1988.
Diskografiya adigskoi narodnoi muziki [Discography of Circassian National Music], Maikop, 1998. [Reference book on about 400 gramophone records issued in the period from the beginning of the 20th century to the end of the 1980s]
Adyghe Traditional Polyphony and Its Transformation in Modern Conditions (accessed 1 February 2008).
Music as a Medicine for Adyghs, in R. Kopiez, A. C. Lehmann, I. Wolther and C. Wolf (eds), Proceedings of the Fifth Triennial European Society for the Cognitive Sciences of Music Conference (ESCOM5), Hanover University of *Music and Drama, 8–13 September 2003, pp 160–2. (accessed 9 June 2008).
The Caucasian-Scottish Relations through the Prism of the Fiddle and Dance Music, paper presented at North Atlantic Fiddle Convention, The Elphinstone Institute, University of Aberdeen, July 2006.
Thebisim (Tkhabisimov), W., Gwm yi Weredxer [Songs of the Heart], Maikop, 1983.
Siy Wered–Xekw: Weredxer [My Song–Country: Songs], Maikop, 1989.
Tlekhuch, A. M., 'Istoki i osobennosti razvitiya adigeiskoi muzikalnoi kulturi [Sources and Features of the Development of the Adigean Music Culture]', in Kultura i bit adigov [The Culture and Way of Life of the Circassians], The Adigean Science and Research Institute, Maikop, issue 8, 1991.

Music of the Caucasus
Circassians